Farmington High School is a public high school in Farmington, Connecticut serving grades 9-12. In Newsweek's 2005 poll, FHS was ranked #1 in Connecticut and #271 in the nation, scoring high on both the challenge index and the equity and excellence index.

In June 2017, a town vote to build a new school occurred. The main argument for was that the current building and facilities had aged severely and were in need of modernization. Due to budget concerns, the vote failed. In June 2021, another referendum was held to renovate the school at an estimated cost of $135.6 million; this referendum passed by a wide margin.

Notable alumni 

 Tim Abromaitis, professional basketball player (Notre Dame)
 Nick Bonino,  professional hockey player
 Michael Gladis actor (Mad Men)
 Shawn Haviland, professional baseball player
 Dick McAuliffe, professional baseball player
 Erin Pac, Olympic bobsledder
 Pawel Szajda, actor
 Terry Wooden, former linebacker in the NFL

References

External links
 

Farmington, Connecticut
Schools in Hartford County, Connecticut
Public high schools in Connecticut